Book censorship is the removal, suppression, or restricted circulation of literary, artistic, or educational material – of images, ideas, and information – on the grounds that these are morally or otherwise objectionable according to the standards applied by the censor. Censorship is "the regulation of speech and other forms of expression by an entrenched authority". The overall intent of censorship, in any form, is to act as "a kind of safeguard for society, typically to protect norms and values [...] censorship suppresses what is considered objectionable from a political, moral, or religious standpoint."

The Marshall University Libraries, which conduct research on banned books in the United States, have defined a banned book as one that has been "removed from a library, classroom, etc." and a challenged book as one that "has been requested to be removed from a library, classroom, etc." by a censor.

Public and school libraries in the US have the ability to limit children's choice of books to read. This problem "highlights the tension between parental authority and society, but it is ultimately about defining American Value." It has been suggested that as there are parental guidance to films, there is a need for something similar for books. Some of the banned books are valuable in helping children discover their identities or educate themselves. These are not all banned in all states, by all educators. 

Sponsors of literacy in education have carried out censorship, including parents, school boards, lobbying groups, clergy, librarians and teachers. Banning, one of the most permanent and effective method of censorship, begins with a challenge and then progresses until the book is no longer available to any student in a school, library or district. In many cases, books are banned or petitioned to be banned by parents who are concerned about the material their children are reading. People For The American Way reported that in the school year from 1991–1992, the success of censors in having books removed in some capacity rose to 41 percent from 34 percent in the previous year. In response, several professional organizations such as the American Library Association (ALA), the Freedom to Read Foundation, and the National Coalition Against Censorship have employed various initiatives to help combat book censorship in all its forms. Combating book censorship with their advocacy for First Amendment rights, these long-standing organizations have been at the center of multiple Supreme Court cases spanning from the early 1970s.

History
During the 17th century, a typical form of book censorship in the United States was book burning. In October 1650, William Pynchon's pamphlet, The Meritorious Price of Our Redemption, was criticized and promptly burned by the Puritan government. This book burning in Boston, Massachusetts is often referred to and even considered the "first book burning in America".

On March 3, 1873, the Comstock Law was passed by the United States Congress under the Grant administration; also referred to as an Act for the "Suppression of Trade in, and Circulation of, Obscene Literature and Articles of Immoral Use". The Act criminalized usage of the U.S. Postal Service to send any of the following items: erotica, contraceptive, abortifacients, sex toys, personal letters alluding to any sexual content or information, or any information regarding the above items. The Act not only restrained the distribution of pornography but also the spread of medical journals that held information regarding contraceptives and abortion. In Washington, D.C., where the federal government has direct jurisdiction, the act also made it a misdemeanor, punishable by fine and imprisonment, to sell, give away, or have in possession any "obscene" publication. Half of the states passed similar anti-obscenity statutes that also banned possession and sale of obscene materials.

Leaves of Grass, Walt Whitman's collection of poetry, was withdrawn in Boston in 1881, after the District Attorney threatened criminal prosecution for the use of explicit language in some poems. The work was later published in Philadelphia. This version went through five editions of 1,000 copies each. Its first printing, released on July 18, 1882 sold out in a day.

Mark Twain's book Adventures of Huckleberry Finn has been challenged. It was first published in the United States in February 1885 and was promptly banned by librarians in Massachusetts in March of the same year. The book has faced further scrutiny in recent times due to Twain's frequent use of the word "nigger" as well as the novel being described as "racially insensitive," and as "perpetuat[ing] racism." It has since been, and still remains, among the top 100 most challenged books up to date.

In 1915, architect William Sanger was charged under New York law for disseminating contraceptive information. His wife, Margaret Sanger, was similarly charged in 1915 for her work The Woman Rebel. Sanger circulated this work through the U.S. postal service, effectively violating the Comstock Law. On appeal, her conviction was reversed on the grounds that contraceptive devices could legally be promoted for the cure and prevention of disease.

The publication of Charles Darwin's On the Origin of Species in 1859 "unleashed a controversy that resonates even today. In presenting a revolutionary theory of evolution, the British naturalist challenged the biblical creation story and provoked the ire of detractors who accused him of 'dethroning God'. Despite the surrounding controversy, On the Origin of Species remained uncensored in the United States into the 1920s, when high school curricula started to incorporate the theory of Darwinian evolution." It was soon after banned in parts of America following the Scopes Trial in Tennessee. The Tennessee ban remained until 1967, "when the Supreme Court declared it in conflict with the First and Fourteenth Amendments".

The banning of books became more prevalent during the twentieth century as modernist and progressive writers such as James Joyce, Theodore Dreiser, Ernest Hemingway, F. Scott Fitzgerald, and John Steinbeck began their literary careers. These authors did not refrain from revealing their opinions about controversial subject matter. For example, Hemingway's A Farewell to Arms depicts the grim realities of World War I, and the story of the two lovers, Frederic Henry and Catherine Barkley, includes graphic details of a childbirth gone awry. This story strays greatly from traditionalist literature, the majority of American literature at the time, which depicted good prevailing over evil. Some cities, including Boston, banned A Farewell to Arms in 1929, labeling the book "salacious."

In addition, Boston in the 1920s censored other novels, such as The American Mercury, Elmer Gantry, An American Tragedy, Lady Chatterley's Lover, and the published text of the play Strange Interlude. The rise of censorship in Boston aroused local opposition. An article in a 1929 issue of The Harvard Crimson stated: "it has become so tiresome to reproach Boston for their constant repression of creative work, that we are beginning to surrender in despair." The Boston censors countered that the censorship was justified because according to the U.S. federal political system, it is the duty of the states to implant their educational policies. The texts selected for the schools are ultimately approved by the state. School boards, as part of the Tenth Amendment, do have the right to select which state-approved text should be placed in the libraries. Over the years, parents on school boards have challenged their state's selection of certain books for their libraries. The main reasons of the parents and school boards is to protect children from content deemed by them as inappropriate.

The state of Georgia created the Georgia Literature Commission in 1953, which initially described its role as aiding local prosecutors in enforcing the state's obscenity laws. In 1958, it gained the power to issue subpoenas and injunctions to stop publication. It censored hundreds of publications, but became less powerful after court rulings against it in the 1960s, and was abolished in 1973.

In 2022, a report by the American Library Association found that book censorship had increased to unprecedented levels. The report noted that much of the censorship was directed towards books featuring LGBT and racial minority perspectives, and described a growing trend of harassment and intimidation of librarians.

School boards
School boards have frequently been involved in litigation involving the rights of freedom to read, which is considered by some organizations to be encompassed in the First Amendment. Some legal cases have reached state supreme courts and the United States courts of appeals. Cases like Evans v. Selma Union High School District of Fresno County in 1924 ruled "The mere act of purchasing a book to be added to the school library does not carry with it any implication of the adoption of the theory or dogma contained therein, or any approval of the book itself except as a work of literature fit to be included in a reference library." In Minarcini v. Strongsville City School District in 1976, the court upheld the school district's decision to not allow certain texts to be used in a curriculum, but "found the removal of the books from the library to be unconstitutional, referring to the library as a 'storehouse of knowledge.'"

Censorship has also been addressed by the United States Supreme Court in the case Island Trees School District v. Pico in 1982.  This case involved the school board removing certain books that it deemed inappropriate. The court came to the conclusion that, "The First Amendment imposes limitations upon a local school board's" discretion to remove books from high and junior high school libraries. The case was brought to the Supreme Court by five students who challenged their school board's decision to remove nine books from the school's library, after a challenge came from an organization called Parents of New York United. The Supreme Court ruled that, under the First Amendment, "Local school boards may not remove books from school library shelves simply because they dislike the ideas contained in those books". Justice William Brennan, who wrote the opinion, reasoned that "Local school boards have broad discretion in the management of school affairs, but such discretion must be exercised in a manner that comports with the transcendent imperatives of the First Amendment". Brennan continues that school boards do have "absolute discretion to choose academic materials" and what texts are used in classrooms, so removing books from curriculum would not be unconstitutional, as long as a school board's discretion is not "exercised in a narrowly partisan or political manner." Finally, he comments on the library, saying it is a distinct institution as it represents the First Amendment's "role in affording the public access to discussion, debate and the dissemination of information and ideas." "

Reasons for censorship 

Books are often challenged by concerned parents who desire to protect their children from the themes or content within books. Books can be banned for more than one reason as well.  As of the ten years preceding 2016, the top three reasons cited for challenging materials as reported to the Office of Intellectual Freedom were:

 The material was considered to be "sexually explicit".
 The material contained "offensive language".
 The material was "unsuited for a certain age group".

According to the American Library Association (ALA), there are also more than 20 other reasons for censorship, including the material containing or being: anti-ethnic, cultural sensitivity, racism, sexism, anti-family, nudity, offensive language, other offensive items, abortion, drug/alcohol/smoking, gambling, gangs, violence, suicide, homosexuality, sexually explicit, political viewpoint, religious viewpoint, occult/Satanism, unsuited for age group, inaccurate, technical errors, and other objections. According to People for the American Way, "sexually explicit" material was the most frequent cause of book challenges in the decade from 1990 to 2000, while "offensive language" was responsible for the second-most number.

Social 

Numerous books have been suppressed "because of language, racial characterization, or depiction of drug use, social class, or sexual orientation of the characters, or other social differences that the challengers viewed as harmful to the readers." There are many examples of books being suppressed on social grounds in the United States. Dawn Sova authored Literature Suppressed on Social Grounds, an essay that lists books that have been banned or challenged on the preceding grounds to raise awareness of why books are censored. A few examples of this type of censorship are J. D. Salinger's The Catcher in the Rye, Ken Kesey's One Flew Over the Cuckoo's Nest, and Mark Twain's Adventures of Huckleberry Finn. All of these stories have main characters who disrespect authority and don't live according to societal norms and social rules. Holden Caulfield, Randle McMurphy, and Huck Finn are similar in their use of vulgar language and anti-traditionalist world views. All of these books have themes of characters who are idolized for breaking the rules and living life that is full of pleasures instead of listening and adhering to traditional order. Sova suggests that censors have sought to ban these books because they fear that the rebellious nature of the characters will lead children to follow them, meaning they will have no respect for their parents, the law or teachers.

Adventures of Huckleberry Finn (1884) by Mark Twain was listed by the American Library Association as the 5th most commonly banned book in the U.S. due to racism in 2007. NewSouth Books received media attention for publishing an expurgated edition of the work that censored the words nigger and Injun. A parent in a school district in Arizona attempted to have the novel banned in a case that reached the United States Court of Appeals for the Ninth Circuit in the case Monteiro v. The Tempe Union High School District (1998).

In August 1939, the Board of Supervisors of Kern County, California passed a resolution to ban The Grapes of Wrath from county libraries and schools. The head librarian of the Kern County Free Library, Gretchen Knief, despite personally protesting to the supervisors, complied with the ban. The ban is said to have been largely a product of the county's reliance upon agriculture, and Knief's compliance, along with a lack of official support from librarians. The ban was rescinded in 1941.

In September 2020, the Burbank Unified School District in California removed from required reading To Kill a Mockingbird, Adventures of Huckleberry Finn, Of Mice and Men, The Cay, and Roll of Thunder, Hear My Cry from middle school and high school curriculum after parents showed concerns over racism.

Political 
The State Department, the Central Intelligence Agency and the Federal Bureau of Narcotics sought to suppress an academic work about the influence of the China lobby in congress and the executive branch of the US Government, and about heroin trafficking by the Chinese Nationalist Party, then the ruling party of the military dictatorship in Taiwan. The suppression was instigated by the Chinese Nationalist Party through their embassy, after they initially threatened a libel suit against the publisher, MacMillan.

Books have been suppressed for their political content by local governments and school districts. In particular books that some perceive to promote anarchism, communism or socialism have a history of being suppressed in the United States. The Communist Manifesto by Karl Marx and Friedrich Engels was frequently challenged and widely restricted in libraries because of its communist ideas, especially during the Red Scare in the 1950s. George Orwell's Nineteen Eighty-Four was challenged in Jackson County, Florida in 1981 because it was deemed "pro-communist and contained explicit sexual matter." In 1980, Irwin Schiff published the Federal Mafia which was found to be fraudulent by the Ninth Circuit Court of Appeals.

Sexual 

Reviews for Theodore Dreiser's The "Genius" (1915) were mixed at best. The Kansas City Star, like many Midwestern dailies, labeled the novel "a procession of sordid philandering," while the Milwaukee Journal derided Dreiser as a "literary Caliban," wallowing in depravity. Many libraries and bookstores refused to stock the book, and the New York Society for the Suppression of Vice threatened legal action, leading Dreiser's supporters to issue their own call to arms. Critic Willard Huntington Wright, former editor of the Los Angeles Times Book Review and The Smart Set and a Dreiser admirer of long standing, threw himself "wholeheartedly into an anti-censorship campaign on behalf of [the novel]. Along with Alfred Knopf, John Cowper Powys, [publisher Ben] Huebsch, and H.L. Mencken, [he] circulated petitions and drummed up support wherever he could for the man he believed to be the most significant, unjustly harassed writer of the day." Eventually, five hundred writers signed an Authors' League petition on behalf of The "Genius", including Willa Cather, Max Eastman, Robert Frost, Sinclair Lewis, Jack London, Amy Lowell, Jack Reed, Edwin Arlington Robinson, Ida Tarbell, and Booth Tarkington.

The foreword to the 1923 reissue of the novel addressed the censorship issue directly: "It has been urged that this book is detrimental to the morals of the young and might have had a bad effect upon people with weak moral sense, but are thousands of perfectly normal and responsible people to be denied this form of aesthetic stimulation simply because it is harmful to children and perverts?"

Copies of the literary journal The Little Review containing episodes from James Joyce's novel Ulysses were seized by the United States Postal Service under the Comstock law. Ulysses was suppressed in 1921 for obscenity, because of a scene that involved masturbation, first published in The Little Review. Ulysses was then the subject of a court challenge in 1933, United States v. One Book Called Ulysses. Judge John M. Woolsey's ruling that the book was not obscene marked a change in how the courts viewed obscenities in novels.

Henry Miller's novel Tropic of Cancer has been described as "notorious for its candid sexuality" and as responsible for the "free speech that we now take for granted in literature". It was first published in 1934 by the Obelisk Press in Paris, France, but this edition was banned in the United States. Its publication in 1961 in the U.S. by Grove Press led to obscenity trials that tested American laws on pornography in the early 1960s. In 1964, the Supreme Court declared the book non-obscene. It is regarded as an important work of 20th-century literature.

The children's book And Tango Makes Three has been one of the most challenged books in the 21st century due to the plot, which focuses on two homosexual penguins in the Central Park Zoo. Tango is one of several books that have been censored because of homosexual themes. In 2003, the children's book The Family Book was removed from the curriculum of the Erie, Illinois school system due to the book's representation of same-sex families.

Flowers for Algernon, a science fiction short story and subsequent novel written by Daniel Keyes, is on the American Library Association's list of the 100 Most Frequently Challenged Books of 1990–1999 at number 43. The reasons for the challenges vary, but usually center on those parts of the novel in which Charlie struggles to understand and express his sexual desires. Many of the challenges have proved unsuccessful, but the book has occasionally been removed from school libraries, including some in Pennsylvania and Texas.
It won the Hugo Award for Best Short Story in 1960. The novel was published in 1966 and was joint winner of that year's Nebula Award for Best Novel (with Babel-17).

Religious 
In the United States, books have also been challenged for attacking or disagreeing with religious beliefs. On the Origin of Species by Charles Darwin has been challenged and suppressed since its publication in 1859 due to its theories on evolution, though not until 1925 in the US, when the Butler Act was enacted in Tennessee, banning the teaching of evolutionary theories statewide. Works, such as the Harry Potter series, have also been challenged because they are perceived by some to promote witchcraft and the occult.

Security
Operation Dark Heart, a 2010 memoir by U.S. Army intelligence officer Lt. Col Anthony Shaffer, was the subject of attempts by the Defense Department to censor information that the book revealed, even after it had already been distributed free of changes. Both censored and original copies of the book are in the public domain.

Parenting 
As an author, John Green said: "Text is meaningless without context. What usually happens with Looking for Alaska is that a parent chooses one page of the novel to send to an administrator and then the book gets banned without anyone who objects to it having read more than that one particular page."

Examples of "banned" books

Brave New World
Aldous Huxley's dystopian novel, Brave New World (1931), was challenged in some school districts. In 2003, in the South Texas Independent School District, Mercedes, Texas it "was challenged but retained". Parents had "objected to the adult themes—sexuality, drugs, suicide—that appeared in the novel.  Huxley's book was part of the summer Science Academy curriculum. The board voted to give parents more control over their children's choices by requiring principals to automatically offer an alternative to a challenged book."

Of Mice and Men 
John Steinbeck's Of Mice and Men, first published in 1937, is considered an American classic and listed as the 12th best novel of the 20th century by the Radcliffe Publishing Course. It has remained a frequent choice for teaching in English curriculums because of its simplistic nature, but profound message. Nevertheless, the novel appeared on the ALA's top ten most frequently challenged books in 2001, 2003 and 2004. Herbert N. Foerstel, the author of Banned in the U.S.A., a novel documenting the cases of censorship in the United States, states that "the censors claim to be protecting the young and impressionable from this tragic tale of crude heroes speaking vulgar language within a setting that implies criticism of our social system." The main reasons for censorship, as observed by the Office of Intellectual Freedom, are "offensive language, racism, unsuited to age group, violence".

A case against the novella began in Normal, Illinois in 2004 when a group of parents and community members in the school district proposed a set of books that could be read instead of Steinbeck's novel that addressed the same themes as Of Mice and Men, but did not have the racial slurs that the group objected to. The group also suggested that the book should be removed from the permanent, required reading list for a sophomore English curriculum, however, they did not ask that the book be banned. The group appreciated that the novel addressed injustices of the past, but believed the alternative books that they proposed "address multicultural and socially sensitive issues in a meaningful, respectful manner", whereas Steinbeck's novel does not.

To Kill a Mockingbird 
To Kill a Mockingbird (1960), by Harper Lee, won the Pulitzer Prize and has since been considered an American classic. The novel confronts issues of rape and racial inequality, but is highly regarded for its universal themes that can appeal to many readers. The novel has been censored since its 1960 publication and appeared on the ALA's top ten most frequently challenged books in 2009 and 2011. The novel was considered objectionable because it deals with racial injustice, class systems, gender roles, loss of innocence while discussing violence, rape, incest and authority, while using strong language. In July 1996, the Superintendent of the Moss Point School District in Mississippi announced To Kill a Mockingbird would be reviewed by a group of parents, community members and teachers after a complaint came from Reverend Greg Foster about the novel's racial descriptions and discussion of sexual activity. The novel was ultimately banned from being accessed in the school district. Another case began with a resident in Cherry Hill, New Jersey, in 2008, who objected to having To Kill a Mockingbird as part of a high school English curriculum. The challenger had problems with how African Americans were treated in the novel and feared that the descriptions may upset black students who were reading the novel. Instead of banning the book, the school board voted unanimously to keep the book in the curriculum and instead responded to fears of upsetting black students with racial sensitivity training for teachers who used the novel in their classrooms.

The China Lobby in American Politics 
In 1960, The China Lobby in American Politics, by scholar Ross Y. Koen, was suppressed by the State Department, the Central Intelligence Agency and the Federal Bureau of Narcotics at the behest of the ruling Chinese Nationalist Party of Taiwan. The book largely concerned the influence of the China lobby in the US congress and the executive branch of the government. It also discussed the heroin trafficking by the Chinese Nationalist Party – then the ruling party of the military dictatorship in Taiwan. Koen detailed considerable evidence of this, and it was later corroborated by other scholars. The Chinese Nationalist Party instigated the suppression through their embassy in Washington, after they had initially threatened a libel suit against the publisher, MacMillan. After 4000 copies of the book had been printed, at the intervention of the State Department the publisher recalled the book and discontinued publication. Some copies of the book nevertheless found their way into rare book repositories at some universities. According to Richard C. Kagan, right-wing groups stole many remaining copies of the book from libraries. The book was reprinted in 1974 after other scholars had shown Koen's findings to be accurate.

The Catcher in the Rye 
The Catcher in the Rye, by J.D. Salinger, was first published in 1951 and has since been both frequently challenged and taught. In the 1980s, it "had the unusual distinction of being the nation's most frequently censored book, and, at the same time, the second most frequently taught novel in the public schools." The American Library Association deemed it the most censored book from 1966 to 1975 and the tenth most challenged book from 1990 to 1999. The novel also appears as the second best and most classic novel of the 20th century based on a list developed by the Radcliffe Publishing Course.

The majority of the objections have been over the novel's language, but the book also has mentions of prostitution, sexuality and underage drinking, as cited by the book review published by the organization Focus on the Family, an American, conservative group. The ALA cites the reasons for censorship as "offensive language, sexually explicit, unsuited to age group". The first case of censorship the book ever witnessed was in 1960 when it was banned in a Tulsa, Oklahoma school district and the eleventh grade teacher who had assigned the book was fired because of the questionable content of the book. A case in Paris, Maine in 1996 allowed for The Catcher in the Rye to continue being taught at the district high school, but mandated practices that would tell parents what books their children read, ultimately leaving it in the hands of parents to decide what their children should read, rather than the school.

The Harry Potter series 
The seven-novel series featuring Harry Potter by J.K. Rowling has been on best-seller lists since the first book was published in 1997. The series was most frequently challenged in 2001 and 2002, before falling to second-most challenged book in 2003. The ALA cites the reasons for censorship as "anti-family, occult/Satanism, religious viewpoint, violence", but the American Civil Liberties Union of Texas's "Free People Read Freely" report also cited concerns over sexual content.

In one case in Lawrenceville, Georgia in 2007, a parent asked that the Harry Potter books be kept out of classrooms, suggesting that the novels promote the practice of witchcraft and contain violent content that is not suitable for her 15-year-old daughter to read as she was becoming inspired to try witchcraft in the manner of the series' characters. School board attorney, Victoria Sweeney, presented evidence for why the novels should be kept in the classroom, noting that they encourage children's fascination with reading and explore themes such as good triumphing over evil. The board ultimately unanimously decided to keep the books in the classroom since they had the potential to spark creativity and imagination, as well as a love for learning and reading.

Fun Home 
In October 2006, a resident of Marshall, Missouri attempted to have the graphic novel Fun Home by Alison Bechdel removed from the Marshall Public Library. The book addresses themes of sexual orientation, gender roles, suicide, emotional abuse, dysfunctional family life, and the role of literature in understanding oneself and one's family. These challenges are significant because the fact that they are filled with illustrations make them more likely to be accessible to younger children, and therefore, more susceptible to challenges when the content is considered mature for the audience.

George 

In 2018, 2019, and 2020, Alex Gino's book, George, was reported as the most challenged book in public education according to the American Library Association's annual top ten challenged books. The book was challenged for its "LGBTQIA+ content," yet censorers provided other stated reasons for challenging the novel, for instance "for conflicting with a religious viewpoint and “traditional family structure” and potentially "creating confusion."

The Hate U Give 
Angie Thomas's The Hate U Give tells the story of a black teen who witnesses her childhood friend get shot by the police. In 2017, the book was ranked number 8 on the American Library Association’s top ten challenge and banned books list. The book was also banned by school officials in Katy, Texas. It was challenged for its “pervasive vulgarity and racially-insensitive language. The book was also challenged for depicting drug use, profanity, and offensive language.

The Hunger Games trilogy 
Suzanne Collins's The Hunger Games is a young adult Dystopian Novel that tells the story from the perspective of Katniss Everdeen, a 16 year-old living under a strict dictatorship in a post-apocalyptic world. The series emphasizes rebellion and uprising, government control, corrupt political power, and the breakdown of different districts represents the not-so-equal distribution of wealth. The book also includes themes of violence, poverty and love which can also be challenged.  In 2014, the book was banned for the insertion of religious perspective. The series ended up being banned and/or challenged throughout the years for reasons that include, but are not limited to: insensitivity, offensive language, violence, anti-family, anti-ethic, and occult/satanic. One parent in New Hampshire stated that the series had given her 11-year old nightmares. She also stated that it could numb children to violence.

Organizations opposing book censorship 

Established in 1876, the American Library Association is the oldest and largest library association in the world "to provide leadership for the development, promotion and improvement of library and information services and the profession of librarianship in order to enhance learning and ensure access to information for all." The American Library Association's website has observed that the top three reasons for book censorship in the United States are that: the material was considered to be "sexually explicit", the content contained "offensive language", or the book was "unsuited to any age group." The Freedom to Read Foundation focuses more on the legal issues regarding book censorship. One of their main objectives is "to supply legal counsel, which counsel may or may not be directly employed by the Foundation, and otherwise to provide support to such libraries and librarians as are suffering legal injustices." Founded on November 20, 1969, the association made its first U.S. Supreme Court appeal in Kaplan v. California. The case involved an "adult" bookstore owner who was convicted of "violating a California obscenity statute by selling a plain-covered unillustrated book containing repetitively descriptive material of an explicitly sexual nature." The Freedom to Read Foundation brought the case before the Supreme Court and filed "a motion asking the Court to consider an amicus brief addressing constitutional questions posed by the new three-prong test for obscenity in Miller v. California." The motion was ultimately denied as the Court ruled that First Amendment rights only applied to "serious literature or political works".

Banned Books Week 
On ALA's website there is a section of "Banned & Challenged Books" and they release most banned and challenged books every year; however, they also organize Banned Books Week, "an annual event celebrating the freedom to read." usually taking place during the last week of September. Banned Books Week is the product of a national alliance between organizations who strive to bring awareness to banned books. Founded by first amendment and library activist Judy Krug and the Association of American Publishers in 1982 with the goal of bringing banned books "to the attention of the American public". By the year 2000, the intention of this event expanded to "bring[ing] together the entire book community; librarians, booksellers, publishers, journalists, teachers, and readers of all types, in shared support of the freedom to seek and to express ideas, even those some consider unorthodox or unpopular." The coalition that now sponsors the week each year consists of American Library Association (ALA), the American Booksellers Association, American Booksellers foundation for Free Expression (ABFFE), Association of American Publishers, American Society of Journalists and Authors, and has support from the Center for the Book in the Library of Congress. Now the goal of Banned Book Week is not only to invite students and other readers to look at censored or challenged books, but also advocates for literary freedom in schools, libraries, and all places involving books. Its most current goal is "to teach the importance of our first Amendment rights and the power of literature, and to draw attention to the danger that exists when restraints are imposed availability of information in a free society". Banned book week has expanded from just books to addressing the filtering any academic material by schools. This includes software that removes services such as YouTube, social media, and games. The American Association of School Librarians stance on all filtering is that it is important for students to go past "the requirements set for by the Federal Communications Commission in its Child Internet Protection Act".

However, while the week receives a positive reception, that does not mean it is without criticism. Tom Minnery, vice president of Focus on the Family, claims that "the ALA has irresponsibly perpetrated the 'banned' books lie for too long" and that "nothing is 'banned'" and Ruth Graham from Slate magazine agrees. She thinks that celebrating book banning week conflates issues of book censorship in a public library versus a school library, where actual cases of censorship are rather minimal. Groups who generally challenge numerous books, such as Focus on the Family, often stand opposed to Banned Book Week, but that doesn’t mean everyone is. Maddie Crum, a writer for the Huffington Post, argues in defense of the week, stating that the week helps to keep people aware of the fact that Americans’ right of free expression is often limited and in many cases not easily won.

Voices of banned authors

John Green 
American author John Green's novel Looking for Alaska has been challenged due to "offensive language" and "sexually explicit descriptions". Defending his work, Green says that the novel "is arguing really in a rather pointed way that emotionally intimate kissing can be a whole lot more fulfilling than emotionally empty oral sex." The ALA protects him, stating that "challenges do not simply involve a person expressing a point of view; rather, they are an attempt to remove material from the curriculum or library, thereby restricting the access of others. As such, they are a threat to freedom of speech and choice."

David Guterson 
David Guterson's first novel Snow Falling on Cedars was listed as one of the most banned books, having been compared to pornography  and described as sexually inappropriate. When he was writing his second novel, Guterson said it was "always hard to write another book" and that he was "deathly afraid" of having his books banned.

Jason Reynolds 
Jason Reynolds cowrote two of the young adult novels—All American Boys and Stamped: Racism, Antiracism, and You—included on the 2020 and 2019 ALA's top ten challenged books annual list. He responded to these censors in an NPR interview, saying "It's painful to me because what I know is that when these books are banned, there are going to be thousands and thousands of young people who will not get these books."

List of other banned books 
The American Library Association, specifically the Office of Intellectual Freedom,
has maintained a list of books, since 1990, that have been banned or censored in the United States. This is an incomplete list of books, both fiction and non-fiction, that have been challenged or censored in the United States. (See List of Banned & challenged books at the American Library Association and/or the List of most commonly challenged books in the United States Wikipedia page)

See also

References 

 
Censorship in the United States